Velama is a caste found mainly in Andhra Pradesh and Telangana. The earliest occurrence of Velama as a term for a community dates from the 17th century.

Origin and history
The Velamas are described by that name from the 17th century and in the following century some held zamindari positions under the kings of Golconda, which gave them considerable powers over small regions in Telangana. The kings chose to distinguish between these various Velama groups by adopting a system of ranks. This caused a competitive emphasis to be placed on the status and trappings of Velama communities, resulting in rivalries based on recognition of wealth and honours that had been historically granted. Among those that came to dominate were the Velugotis of Venkatagiri, in the coastal Nellore district, and the Appa Raos of Nuzvid. Both of these laid claims to be recognised as royal clans, while other significant groups included the Pitapuram Raos and the Ranga Raos. The Velugotis traced their history to the 12th century and had lived in various places before settling in Nellore district in 1695; their prestige became such that in the 1870s their sons were adopted as heirs by rival Velama clan leaders, such as the Pittapores, whose own lineage otherwise faced extinction due to infertility or early death of male children. Such arrangements enhanced the status of the adopter and the influence of the Velugotis.

Relationship with the Padmanayaka Velama
According to Cynthia Talbot, who has debunked the theories of historians in the British Raj era, the terms Velama and Padmanayaka Velama are not synonyms and Padmanayaka was a status that could be claimed by Telangana warriors of different backgrounds. Velama and Padmanayaka were listed as separate communities in Bhimeswara Puranamu.

Culture
Velamas are Hindus and belong to Vaishnavism section of Hinduism.

Notable People
Vijay Deverakonda

See also
Koppula Velama

References

Further reading
 
 
 Katten, Michael; Making Caste In Nineteenth-Century India: A History of Telling the Bobbili Katha & Velama Identity, University of California at Berkeley, USA
 Roghair, Gene H; 1982, The epic of Palnadu: a study and translation of Palnati virula katha, a Telugu oral tradition from Andhra Pradesh, India, Oxford University Press
 
 

Indian castes
Social groups of Telangana
Social groups of Andhra Pradesh